Matías Perrone is an Argentine footgolf player.

Career

Perrone has won the FootGolf World Cup.

References

Argentine footballers
Living people